Shri M.V. Rajasekharan (12 September 1928 – 13 April 2020) was a politician from the Indian National Congress party and a member of the Legislative Council Karnataka in the upper house of the Government of Karnataka. He was also the Minister of State for Planning, Government of India.

References

External links
 Profile on Rajya Sabha website

1928 births
2020 deaths
Indian National Congress politicians from Karnataka
Rajya Sabha members from Karnataka
Union ministers of state of India
India MPs 1967–1970
Lok Sabha members from Karnataka